The People's Garden (in Hungarian: Népkert) is a park in Miskolc, Hungary. With an area of 56.921 m2, it is the third largest park of Miskolc (after Tapolca-Hejőliget and Csanyik, but since those are in the outer districts, Népkert is the largest park in the city proper. There are many sports facilities in the park.

History
The park was fashioned in the 1870s. At that time it was on the edge of the city; in the next few decades the area became a villa district (several beautiful villas stand there today), and after Miskolc began to grow after World War II, the park became part of today's downtown.

Sights and sports facilities
 Bronze statue of Queen Elisabeth (Sissi) by Alajos Stróbl; it was the first statue of Elisabeth in the country (1899)
 Vigadó Restaurant (designed by Alfréd Hajós; restored in 1996; address: Görgey street 19)
 Statue park
 Sports Hall (built in 1970)
 Ice Hall, a sports hall for ice sports (2006)
 Skating rink (in winter only)
 Two playgrounds

Népkert is also a colloquial name of the park Érsekkert (Archbishop's Garden) in Eger.

Miskolc
Parks in Hungary
Tourist attractions in Miskolc
Geography of Borsod-Abaúj-Zemplén County